Nu Skin Enterprises, Inc. is an American multilevel marketing company that develops and sells personal care products and dietary supplements. Under the Nu Skin and Pharmanex brands, the company sells its products in 54 markets through a network of approximately 1.2 million independent distributors.

In the 1990s, the Federal Trade Commission (FTC) investigated Nu Skin over complaints of its multilevel marketing practices. In 1992, Nu Skin reached settlements with five states that had accused the company of deceptive advertising and overstating the income earned by distributors. In 1994, following an investigation by the FTC, the company paid $1 million and signed a consent decree prohibiting it from making deceptive or unsubstantiated claims about its products. In 1997, the company paid an additional $1.5 million to the FTC to settle allegations of unsubstantiated promotional claims. In January 2014, the Chinese government announced that it was investigating Nu Skin following a People's Daily newspaper report calling it a "suspected illegal pyramid scheme." In 2016, Nu Skin agreed to pay a $47 million settlement for operating a pyramid scheme after being sued by China in a Utah federal court. Nu Skin was also forced to pay another $750,000 for bribing a top Chinese official with funds from Nu Skin's charitable division after a United States Securities and Exchange Commission probe.

History
Nu Skin was founded in 1984 in Provo, Utah. The founders are Blake Roney, Sandie Tillotson, and Steve Lund.  Their mission is "to be a global force for good by empowering people to improve lives with innovative products, rewarding opportunities and an enriching culture."

The company first served the United States market and expanded operations to Canada in 1990. In 1991, the company began operations in Asia, starting in Hong Kong. In 1996, the company listed on the New York Stock Exchange.

In 1998, Nu Skin acquired Generation Health, the parent company of the dietary supplement company Pharmanex. The company owns a patent on a device developed by Pharmanex called a "BioPhotonic Scanner", which is designed to measure the carotenoid level in skin. According to Women's Health Letter, the device was designed merely to help sell more supplements, since per Nu Skin's 2002 annual report, "as customers track their skin carotenoid content, we believe they will be motivated to consistently consume LifePak for longer periods of time."

In the late 1990s, Nu Skin invested in Big Planet, a multilevel marketing company selling Internet services. The New York Times noted that Big Planet appeared to recruit people "even if they have little knowledge of the technology that they are supposed to be selling." A representative of the company stated: "I believe people who have never touched a computer before can become hugely wealthy in this business."

In 2009, Nu Skin began working with LifeGen Technologies, a genomics company based in Madison, Wisconsin. Nu Skin acquired LifeGen in December 2011. Nu Skin claims LifeGen's genetic database aided in the development of Nu Skin's products, launching the ageLOC brand.

Business model

Nu Skin Enterprises' utilizes a multi-level marketing business model. Each distributor markets products directly to potential customers, and can also recruit and train customers to become distributors. Distributors are paid from the retail markup on products they are able to sell personally, as well as a performance bonus based on the sales of distributors they have recruited. Nu Skin states that it pays approximately 43 percent of its product revenue in sales compensation.

Reception 
In the early 1990s, Nu Skin was investigated by the states of Connecticut, Pennsylvania, Florida, Illinois, Ohio, and Michigan over allegations of misleading marketing practices. Ultimately, in 1992 the company settled with five of these states, admitting no wrongdoing but agreeing to pay the states' investigative costs, refund disgruntled distributors, and revamp its promotional practices. The Connecticut Attorney General did not agree to those terms and sued Nu Skin, however, charging the company with misleading its distributors and operating a pyramid scheme. Nu Skin admitted to no wrongdoing or violation of law and paid Connecticut $85,000 for consumer-protection programs as part of a settlement.

In 1997, the Attorney General of Pennsylvania sued Nu Skin, alleging that the company operated a pyramid scheme through a subsidiary, QIQ Connections. The Attorney General's office alleged that distributors paid for the right to market technology services that did not, in fact, exist. Nu Skin discontinued the QIQ subsidiary, allowing those who had paid QIQ to transition to Big Planet, another Nu Skin interest marketing Internet technology. The president of Big Planet described the pyramid-scheme allegations as a matter of "a few distributors who in their enthusiasm have been overzealous in some of their marketing activities."

In 2010, Nu Skin was listed among Forbes "100 Most Trustworthy Companies".

In 2012, Stanford University sent a cease and desist letter to halt the use of the name of one of its researchers in Nu Skin's advertising claims. Stanford later released a statement regarding its long-standing, research-based relationship with Nu Skin explaining that the letter was sent to Nu Skin as a request by Stuart Kim a professor at Stanford. Kim requested in the letter that his name be removed from Nu Skin's marketing materials as he is no longer involved with research funded by Nu Skin.  The letter did not, however, recognize the existing research relationship between Stanford and Nu Skin. Stanford apologized for any misunderstandings that may have resulted.

Also in 2012, Citron Research issued a report "stating that Nu Skin's sales model on mainland China, the fastest growing market in direct-selling, amounted to an illegal multilevel marketing scheme." Nu Skin dismissed the claims, calling its sales model in China "kosher" and stating that it had no plans to change its business model in China. In January 2014, the Chinese government announced that it planned to investigate Nu Skin for allegedly operating an illegal pyramid scheme, causing the company's stock price to weaken. Following the investigation, it was announced in March 2014 that the Chinese government would fine Nu Skin for approximately $540,000 dollars due to illegal sales as well as making false product claims.

In February 2014, a securities fraud class action lawsuit was filed in the U.S. District Court for the District of Utah against Nu Skin Enterprises, Inc. on behalf of investors who purchased or otherwise acquired the common stock of the company during the period from July 10, 2013, to January 16, 2014.

In the media 
In a Last Week Tonight with John Oliver segment that was harshly critical of multilevel marketing companies, Oliver criticised Nu Skin for the fact that in 2015, 93% of its distributors did not earn a commission check in a typical month.

Political activities
In 2011, two Utah-incorporated business entities linked to top executives of Nu Skin each made a $1 million contribution to Restore Our Future, a "Super PAC" established by former aides to U.S. presidential candidate Mitt Romney to support his bid for the White House. 
Starting in 1989, Jason Chaffetz worked as a professional spokesman for the company for about ten years.

References

External links 

Companies listed on the New York Stock Exchange
Multi-level marketing companies based in Utah
Personal selling
Retail companies established in 1984
American companies established in 1984
Companies based in Provo, Utah
1984 establishments in Utah
1996 initial public offerings